Deaths along the Bangladesh–India border occur many times a year as result of people attempting to illegally cross into India from Bangladesh, cross border firing and cattle smuggling. Bangladesh and India share a 4,096 kilometer (2,545 mile) border. To prevent smuggling and illegal migration from Bangladesh, the Indian Border Security Force exercises its controversial "Shoot-on-sight" policy. Under this policy, the BSF can shoot any person on site with or without cause. A large portion of the victims are cattle traders and farmers with land near the border. Regarding border killings, Brad Adams, Executive Director of the Asia Department of Human Right Watch state that, "Routinely shooting poor, unarmed villagers is not how the world's largest democracy should behave."

According to a report published by Human rights organisations, around 1,000 Bangladeshi civilians have been killed by Indian Border Security Force (BSF) in a period of 10 years (from 2001 to 2010). The report also states that Indian paramilitary forces routinely threaten, abuse arbitrarily detain and torture local Bangladeshi civilians living along the border and Bangladeshi border guards usually don't help the Bangladeshi civilians. Odhikar, a Bangladesh-based human right organization, allege that acts of rape and looting have also been perpetrated by BSF at the border areas.

Illegal migration

Indian Border Security Force (BSF) exercises its controversial 'Shoot-on-Sight' policy to stop illegal migration. The-then head of BSF, Raman Srivastava, states that 'people should not feel sorry for the victims as they were trying to illegally enter into India and therefore they are a legitimate target'. The killings along Bangladesh-India border are a routine and arbitrary. Around 1,000 people, mostly Bangladeshi nationals, have been killed by Indian border security forces over the period of 10 years. None of the Indian BSF personnel involved in killings along the border was ever prosecuted. Human Rights Watch (HRW) report states that BSF justifies killing by claiming that it was an act of self-defence or that the suspects were evading arrest. However, the reports filed by the BSF with the Indian police don't show recovery of any lethal weapon or explosives from the victim which justifies self-defense. Several survivors and eyewitnesses of BSF attacks allege that the BSF resort to indiscriminate shooting without issuing any warning. Indian villagers residing on the Indian side of the border also accuse BSF of indiscriminate firing and unprovoked beating.

Often Indian border guards kill a person and leave his body near the fence or hang him in the camp to show the extent of power exercised by Border Security Force (BSF). Odhikar, a Bangladesh-based human right organisation, allege that Border Security Force (BSF) and Indian miscreants have also committed act of rape against Bangladeshi women's along the border.

Human Right Watch (HRW) reports that Indian Border Security Force (BSF), which has long record of severe human right abuses, is exempt from criminal prosecution unless it is specifically ordered by the Indian government to undertake a prosecution in a particular case.

Killing of Felani Khatun

On 7 January 2011, a 15-year-old girl, Felani, was shot dead while illegally entering Bangladesh from India by the BSF in Phulbari upazila, Kurigram. She had gotten stuck on the barbed wire when she was shot and she remained there for 5 hours until she bled to death. This resulted in protests in Bangladesh. In 2015 National Human Rights Commission of India asked the Indian government to pay INR 500,000 compensation to her family.

Indian nationals killed by Border Guards Bangladesh
Some Indian nationals were also reported to have been killed by Border Guards Bangladesh (BGB) on suspicion of being a smuggler. On 21 January 2012, Indian officials claimed that 4 BGB soldiers crossed into India and killed an Indian national. The 4 soldiers tried to drag the body of Indian national when they were stopped by Indian locals who gathered at site after hearing gun shots. The locals captured 1 BGB soldiers while the other 3 BGB soldiers managed to flee. The Bangladeshi officials claim that the slain Indian national was a smuggler, however, Indian officials claim that the slain Indian national was just a farmer.

On 7 April 2015, Indian officials reported that Border Guards Bangladesh (BGB) had crossed 10 kilometers in Indian territory and killed two Indian nationals. The body of one Indian national was taken back by Bangladesh. The incident created tensions between BSF and BGB. The Bangladeshi officials claimed that the Indian nationals, who were killed, were smugglers.

Cross border firing
Civilians living near India and Bangladesh border also fall victim to cross border firing between Border Security Force (BSF) and Border Guard Bangladesh (BGB).

From 16 to 20 April 2001, India and Bangladesh exchanged gunfire in a border clash. 16 BSF soldiers were killed in the clash.

On 16 April 2005, India and Bangladesh border troops engaged in gunbattle that resulted in death of two Indian border soldiers and two Bangladeshi civilians. Bangladesh border guard state that the bodies of Indian border soldier and an officer was lying inside Bangladesh territory. Bangladesh border guards claim that a platoon of Indian border guards along with some 100 Indian civilians entered into Bangladesh territory and resorted to looting in Hirapur village. Indian border guards and civilians intrusion in Bangladesh prompted Bangladesh border guards to retaliate. However, according to Indian military officials, Indian border guards had requested flag meeting to secure the release of an Indian villager abducted earlier by Bangladesh border guards. Bangladesh border guards instead abducted BSF officer named Assistant Commandant Jiwan Kumar from the meeting and took him into Bangladesh where he was tortured and later killed.

On 18 July 2008, two Bangladesh border guards were killed by Border Security Force (BSF). Indian officials claim that the BSF soldiers were pursuing a cattle smuggler when Bangladesh border guard started firing at them which prompted BSF troops retaliate. In the ensuing firefight two Bangladeshi  border guards were killed and one BSF soldier was injured. According to Indian military officials, Bangladesh border guards were present on the Indian side of the border. However, according to Bangladeshi officials, Bangladesh border guards were only conducting patrol along the border when they were suddenly attacked by Indian BSF.

On 11 February 2013, Bangladeshi officials claim that Border Guard Bangladesh (BGB) killed two Indian nationals. According to Bangladeshi officials, the two Indian nationals were smugglers and they attacked a BGB patrol party which prompted BGB to retaliate. Both the smugglers were killed and their bodies were taken back by BSF. Later on, BSF took position and started firing on BGB which lasted for thirty minutes.

In 2019, Bangladesh border guards shot at BSF personnel. They claimed self defence. One BSF officer was killed.

Cattle smuggling 
In Bangladesh, Indian cattle can become legal through a small tax to the government while India bans all export of cattle. This has become a flash-point issue in the border. The cattle trade according to an estimate in the Christian Science Monitor is close to one billion dollars. A Bangladeshi cattle smuggler was killed in March 2014 in the border near Satkhira Sadar upazila by the BSF. In January 2016, a Bangladeshi cattle smuggler was allegedly tortured to death by members of the BSF Bhurungamari Upazila, Kurigram District. The same month another Bangladesh national was killed by BSF in Sapahar Upazila, Naogaon District. In April 2016 a Bangladeshi cattle trader was shot in Kurigram District. In June 2016, two Bangladeshi smugglers were killed by the BSF in Gomostapur Upazila, Chapainawabganj. In August 2016 a Bangladeshi smuggler was shot dead in the border region in Moheshpur upazila of Jhenidah. In January 2017, a cattle smuggler was allegedly tortured to death by the BSF in Damurhuda Upazila in Chuadanga District.

Farmlands near the border 
A teenager was killed and three others were injured in a BSF shooting in Chuadanga when they went to pick mangos from a tree near the border in May 2016. The BSF suspended 7 of its personnel over the incident.

Bangladeshi casualties
From 2001 to 2010, Human right organisations state that around 1,000 Bangladeshi civilians have been killed by Border Security Force (BSF). From 2012 to 2016, around 146 Bangladeshi civilians were killed by BSF and Indian civilians according to Bangladesh Home Minister, Asaduzzaman Khan Kamal. The Daily Star, a Bangladeshi newspaper, reports that from 2010 to 2016, on average, 40 Bangladeshi nationals were killed at the border every year.

Impact 
The death of Bangladeshi nationals along the Bangladesh–India border has adversely affected the Bangladesh–India relations. The Daily Star described the issue as one that is "highly emotive" in Bangladesh. On the border death Bangladesh Prime Minister Sheikh Hasina said it was a matter of  "grave concern" to her. The border deaths have also been criticized by human rights organisations.

See also
 2001 Bangladesh–India border clashes
 Migrant deaths along the Mexico–United States border

References

Bangladesh–India border
Border killings